Ron Haffkine (born December 13 in New York City, New York) is an American record producer, composer and music manager most recognized for his work as a producer and manager of Dr. Hook & the Medicine Show, an American rock band, producing hit singles including "Sylvia's Mother", "The Cover of Rolling Stone", "Sharing the Night Together", "A Little Bit More" and "When You're in Love with a Beautiful Woman" and achieving 67 Gold and Platinum records.

Career history
Ron Haffkine born in New York City, New York on December 13, contracted polio, at age 12,  and remained completely paralyzed for 2 yrs.  At 21, Ron was a musician and composer in Greenwich Village who met and became good friends with 28 year old Shel Silverstein,  an American poet, singer-songwriter, cartoonist, screenwriter, and author of children's books. Haffkine formed and managed a band called The Gurus. Wanting to record the group he walked into Regent Sound in Ny and explained to a sound engineer named Bill Szymczyk, the soon to be producer of The Eagles, that he wanted to make a record, but knew nothing about the process, Bill agreed to help. During the sessions, Ron would tell Bill: "I’d like to hear this or I’d like to hear that, or… there’s not enough of this or there’s too much of that". When finished, Ron played it for Shel, known as the writer of "A Boy Named Sue," which Johnny Cash parlayed into a hit, he was so impressed that he told Ron about a couple of films that he was writing the soundtrack for and that he needed someone to produce the music.

Who Is Harry Kellerman & Dr. Hook

Haffkine became the musical director for free for the Herb Gardner movie "Who is Harry Kellerman" which Dustin Hoffman, the star of The Graduate, Midnight Cowboy and Little Big Man, played a songwriter.  One scene in the Hoffman film required a band on stage, but Ron didn't like the band, so he recommended a band called Dr. Hook. He had heard them playing in a bar called The Sands, in Union City, New Jersey.  The producers, Shel and Dustin said "No".  Unrelenting, Ron offered to pay for a showcase of the group on the condition that they all attend. They all attended and they all agreed to use Dr. Hook in the film. With the help of producer Haffkine the group recorded two songs for the film: Locorriere sang the lead on both "The Last Morning," the movie's theme song, later re-recorded for their second album, Sloppy Seconds, and "Bunky and Lucille," which the band can be seen performing in the film. Haffkine felt that the film would not be a great box office hit but the soundtrack had a lot of momentum so he arranged a meeting with Clive Davis, CBS Records described in Davis's autobiography. Drummer David used a wastepaper basket to keep the beat, and while Sawyer, Locorriere and Cummings played and sang a few songs, Francis hopped up and danced on the mogul's desk. This meeting secured the band their first record contract. The film, released in 1971 by National General Pictures, received mixed critical reviews and did only modestly at the box office, but later became a cult film.

Ned Kelly

The second film was "Ned Kelly" a movie about an Australian outlaw, featuring Mick Jagger. He produced the soundtrack of the 1970 film featuring Silverstein songs performed by Waylon Jennings, and Kris Kristofferson.

1971 Dr. Hook / Sylvia's Mother release

Silverstein and Dr. Hook & the Medicine Show became a great combination.  Haffkine having a knack for picking great songs, quickly became Dr. Hook’s #1 A&R man, as well as their producer and manager.  Silverstein wrote all the songs for their self-titled debut album, released in 1971, Doctor Hook featured lead vocals, guitar, bass and harmonica by Locorriere, guitarist Cummings, singer Sawyer, drummer David, singer/guitarist, and keyboard player Billy Francis. The album included their first hit, "Sylvia's Mother". "Sylvia's Mother," a subtle parody of teen-heartbreak weepers, flopped on first release, but with some more promotional muscle became the band's first million-seller and hit the Top Five in the summer of 1972. Other titles on the album included Marie Lavaux, Sing Me A Rainbow, Hey Lady Godiva, Four Years Older Than Me, Kiss It Away, Makin' It Natural, I Call That True Love, When She Cries, Judy, Mama, I'll Sing One Song For You. It has been released 20 times in the US, UK, Netherlands, Italy, Yugoslavia, Canada, Europe, Spain and Greece.

Sloppy Seconds

Silverstein continued to write songs for Dr. Hook including their entire second album, Sloppy Seconds, now released 16 times in the US, Australia, UK, Netherlands, Europe and Canada.  It featured some of their most popular songs, including "Freakin' at the Freaker's Ball", and "The Cover of the Rolling Stone."  Other titles on the album were "If I'd Only Come And Gone", "The Things I Didn't Say", "Carry Me Carrie", "Get My Rocks Off", "Last Mornin'", "I Can't Touch The Sun", "Queen Of The Silver Dollar", "Turn On The World", "Stayin' Song".  The album was listed in the Billboard 200 in 1973.

The Cover of the Rolling Stone

Ron locked horns again with Clive Davis for 3 months over Silverstein’s Cover of the Rolling Stone because of the lyrics "We take all kinds of pills to get all kinds of thrills" and "I got a freaky old lady named Cocaine Katy". Ron knew that If they put out another Sylvia’s Mother... Dr. Hook would be finished! Clive told the label to release it. Ron, against all opinions asked that nothing else be done to the song stating, "it’s perfect just the way it is". The Cover of the Rolling Stone was not their biggest hit, but it turned out to be the most significant song of Dr. Hook’s career.

On the heels of the successful record Haffkine visited Jann Wenner, one of the founders of Rolling Stone Magazine, proclaiming "I’ve just given you guys the best commercial for this rag that you’ll ever get" in the hopes they would secure an interview with the magazine. They did and the Rolling Stone sent Cameron Crowe who later wrote and directed "Jerry McGuire" to do the interview, who at the time was their 16 yr. old wiz-kid reporter, and in March, 1973, issue 131, Dr. Hook and the Medicine Show appeared on the cover of Rolling Stone.

Even with the success of "the Cover of the Rolling Stone" the BBC Radio network refused to play it as it violated their advertising a trademark name rules, (the Kinks had to change "Coca-Cola" to "Cherry Cola" in their song "Lola" to get around the rule). CBS Records responded by setting up a phone line that would play the song to anyone willing to dial in, which helped build the buzz. The BBC was only able to play the song after some of their DJs edited themselves shouting the words "Radio Times" over "Rolling Stone" (Radio Times was a show on the BBC).

1973 Belly Up

In 1973 all was not well for Haffkine and Dr. Hook & The Medicine Show. David left the band and was replaced by John Wolters. The group had a difficult time meeting the high expectations created by Sloppy Seconds, and the result was Belly Up, which Huey noted "was unfortunately prophetic." Belly Up included "Acapulco Goldie", "Penicillin Penny", "Life Ain't Easy", "When Lily Was Queen", "Monterey Jack", "You Ain't Got the Right", "Put a Little Bit On Me", "Ballad Of....", "Roland the Roadie Gertrude the Groupie", "Come On In", and "The Wonderful Soup Stone". The album was sold in the US, UK, Europe and Canada. Dr. Hook was just as famed for their crazed stage antics, which ranged from surreal banter to impersonating their own opening acts, but it was the group's nonchalance about business matters that led to bankruptcy."If we were in the black when we finished a tour, we'd party into the red," says Locorriere. They were forced to file bankruptcy in 1974, although they continued to tour incessantly.

1973-74 Olivia Newton-John

In 1973- 1974 Haffkine, Ray Sawyer and Dennis Locorriere of Dr. Hook & the Medicine Show composed "You Ain't Got the Right" for Olivia Newton-John on her Crystal Lady and If You Love Me, Let Me Know albums. If You Love Me, Let Me Know in 1974 was on the Billboard 200 at #1 and Billboard Top Country Albums at #1.

1975 Move to Nashville

At the time, in Nashville, Kyle Lehning, now famous for his body of work with Randy Travis was producing Waylon Jennings and wanted to meet Ron’s engineer, Roy Hally. Kyle knew Shel Silverstein, so he got Shel to introduce him to Ron, and Ron in turn introduced Kyle to Roy. When they met, Kyle said to Ron; "Why don’t you make a record in Nashville?" Ron said: "I’ don’t know how to make a record with studio musicians". So Kyle hired the musicians and showed Ron how sessions were done in Nashville.

1975 Dr. Hook signs with Capitol

The band shortened its name to Dr. Hook in 1975. They signed with Capitol in 1975 with the aptly titled album Bankrupt. Unlike previous projects, this album included original material written by the group. The hit from the project was a reworked version of Sam Cooke's "Only Sixteen", revitalizing their career and charted in the top ten in 1976.  When Haffkine found a little tune called A Little Bit More, written and originally performed by Bobby Gosh, on a vinyl record, released on his 1973 album Sitting in the Quiet.  at a flea market for 35 cents in San Francisco, things exploded for Dr. Hook.  It charted at number 11 on the US Billboard Hot 100, and spent two weeks at number nine on the Cash Box Top 100. It reached number two on the UK Singles Chart. It was Dr. Hook's joint second-best UK chart placing, matching "Sylvia's Mother" and surpassed only by "When You're in Love with a Beautiful Woman when it reached number 1 for several weeks in 1979 in the UK. A number of great certified million sellers came next with""Sharing the Night Together" reaching number 6, "Sexy Eyes" reaching number 5, "A Little Bit More" reached number 11) and "Better Love Next Time" reached number 12.

1978 Songs & Stories - Shel Silverstein

 Together Haffkine and Silverstein produced a collection of scatological renaissance style poetry and satire onto vinyl, six years after its predecessor, Freakin' at the Freakers Ball (1972). The record's adult content aptly demonstrated one of Silverstein's most distinguishing lyrical motifs when dealing with controversial material.  The album titles tackle a myriad of social taboos, including homosexual incest ("Father of a Boy Named Sue"), prolific marijuana ("The Smoke Off") and cocaine ("They Held Me Down") use, and even an interspecies love song ("The Cat and the Rat"). Silverstein occasionally accompanies himself on acoustic guitar, with an undeniable quirky melodic style. In 2002, Songs & Stories was issued on CD by laugh.com.

1979 Pleasure & Pain

Pleasure & Pain, released in 1979, was Dr. Hook's first gold album. According to Steve Huey, of All Music Guide, it solidified their reputation as "disco-tinged balladeers." Bob "Willard" Henke joined the band while Elswit took a year off to recover from cancer. But Sawyer was increasingly upset at the commercial direction the group's sound was taking, and left the band in 1980. Henke left soon after to be replaced with Rod Smarr. The band changed labels again, but could not replicate earlier successes, and officially disbanded in 1985.

Keith Stegall and Sexy Eyes

While at Sound Lab with Dr. Hook in 1979,   Steagall came in with ‘Sexy Eyes’ and played it for Ron.  Ron loved it, but said ” there's a weak line, fix the line and bring it back”.  Stegall fixed the line and brought it back.  Ron asked, “You ever had a hit before?”.  Stegall replied “no”.  Haffkine replies “well you’re about to”.

"Sexy Eyes"  written by Chris Waters, Bob Mather and Keith Stegall, was recorded and released as a single by Dr. Hook in early 1980. In the United States, the single reached No. 5 on the Billboard Hot 100 and was certified Gold by the RIAA. It was also a Top 10 hit in Canada (#8) and the United Kingdom (#4).

Keith co-wrote his first hit, Dr. Hooks' 1980 smash "Sexy Eyes" and the flood gates opened to him as a songwriter and eventually a producer.

1980 Helen Reddy

In 1980 Haffkine produced Helen Reddy.  The songs produced were A Way With The Ladies, All I Really Need Is You, Killer Barracuda, Last Of The Lovers, Love's Not The Question, Midnight Sunshine, Take What You Find, That Plane, The One I Sing My Love Songs To, Wizard In The Wind and released by Capitol.

1983 Lou Rawls

In 1983 Haffkine produced Lou Rawls on the first version of Wind Beneath My Wings, a song made famous by Bette Midler. Other songs produced for this album were A Couple More Years, I Been Him, If You're Gonna Love Me, Midnight Sunshine, That's When The Magic Begins, The One I Sign My Love Songs To, Upside Down, When The Night Comes, You Can't Take It With You

1983 Where the Sidewalk Ends

Haffkine and Silverstein released "Where the Sidewalk Ends" on cassette in 1983, as an LP phonograph record in 1984, and won the 1984 Grammy Award for Best Recording For Children. The copyright is owned by Sony Music Entertainment Inc. The collection is recited, sung and shouted by Shel Silverstein himself and produced by Ron Haffkine. Shel performed it at the 1984 Grammy Awards.

→The following poems can be heard in the album:

Side A
Invitation
Eighteen Flavors-A person labels all the flavors on their ice cream cone before accidentally dropping them all.
Melinda Mae-A girl tries to eat an entire whale, and actually does so and finishes in eighty years.
Sick-A girl gives excuses not to go to school.
Ickle Me, Pickle Me, Tickle Me Too-Three brothers go for a ride in a giant flying shoe.
Enter This Deserted House
Jimmy Jet and His TV Set-A boy accidentally watches too much TV, therefore, he is turned into a TV.
For Sale-Someone tries to sell their little sister, whom they think is quite annoying.
Warning-Why people shouldn't pick their noses.
The Yipiyuk-A creature bites on a man's foot and refuses to let go.
Crocodile’s Toothache-A crocodile does not like it when a dentist fools around with his teeth.
Stone Telling
Ridiculous Rose-A girl misunderstands what her mother says.
Boa Constrictor-A man suffers being eaten by a snake.
Peanut–Butter Sandwich-A king loves peanut butter sandwiches, but when he eats an extra sticky one, the peanut butter causes trouble.
Listen to the Mustn’ts-A mother tells her child why they should listen to what they're not supposed to do.
I will not hatch-A baby chick refuses to hatch from its egg.

Side B
Hug o’ War-A kid plays a game that includes hugging.
Smart
Forgotten Language
The Farmer and the Queen-A farmer wants to impress a queen, so he asks his animals for suggestions.
The One Who Stayed
No Difference
Wild Boar
Thumbs
Sarah Cynthia Silvia Stout Would Not Take The Garbage Out-A girl refuses take out the garbage, which causes trouble for the whole world.
My Hobby
Early Bird
Me–Stew-When a cook runs out of food for a stew, he decides to make one out of himself.
Captain Hook-A story about the legendary pirate, Captain Hook.
With His Mouth Full of Food
The Flying Festoon
The Silver Fish
The Generals
The Worst
My Beard-A man grows a beard that's so long that he runs naked down the street.
Merry...-A family sets up Christmas at the wrong period of time.
The Search

Silverstein, Shel. Where the Sidewalk Ends. 30. New York: Scholastic, 2005. 1-187.

Production

Producer & Director: Ron Haffkine, Keith Cozart
Engineer: jb & Danny Mundhenk & Oliver Masciarotte
Mastering: Denny Purcell

Recorded at Bullet Recording, Nashville, Blank Tapes, New York, and in Studio D at Criteria Recording in Miami, Florida.

1984 - 1985 A Light in the Attic and Shel Audio

In 1985 Haffkine, producer and Silverstein, writer went on to release A Light in the Attic. Here are some songs that they released between 1984 and 1985; A Light In The Attic, Almost Perfect, Anteater, Ations, Backward Bill, Bear In There, Captain Blackbeard Did What, Clarence, Crowded Tub, Eight Balloons, Eighteen Flavors, Enter This Deserted House,  Examination, Fancy Dive, For Sale, Forgotten Language, Friendship, God's Wheel, Hitting, Homework Machine, How Not To Have To Dry The Dishes, Hug O' War, Hula Eel, Ickle Me, Pickle Me, Tickle Me Too, Invitation, Jimmy Jet And His TV Set, Kidnapped, Ladies First, Listen To The Mustn'ts, Little Abigail And The Beautiful Pony, Melinda Mae, Me-Stew, Monsters I've Met, My Beard, My Hobby, No Difference, Nobody, Outside Or Underneath,  Peckin', Picture Puzzle Piece, Prehistoric, Quick Trip, Ridiculous Rose, Rock And Roll Band, Sick, Signals, Smart, Squishy Touch, Stone Telling, The Dragon Of Grindly Grun, The Farmer And The Queen, The Flying Festoon, The Generals, The Little Boy And The Old Man, The One Who Stayed, The Silver Fish, The Sitter, The Toad And The Kangaroo, The Worst, The Yipiyuk, Thumbs, Tryin' On Clothes, Twistable, Turnable Man, Warning, Whatif, Wild Boar, With His Mouth Full Of Food, Zebra Question.

1991 Davis Daniel

Davis Daniel landed a record deal with Polygram Records in 1991 with the help of his music producer Ron Haffkine.  Haffkine found Daniel driving a beer truck in Nashville, TN and produced his debut album.  People magazine named it the Best Album of the Year, Top 15 in all classes of music and that it delivered a masterpiece cover of the Elvis song, ‘Love me’.

Fighting Fire with Fire, was issued that year. It produced four singles on the country charts: "Picture Me" at number 28, followed by "For Crying Out Loud" at number 13, the title track at number 27 and "Still Got a Crush on You" at number 48. Alanna Nash of Entertainment Weekly gave the album a B rating, comparing Daniel's vocal technique to that of Keith Whitley and saying that he showed promise in carrying on in Whitley's tradition.

Present day

Just before the Covid pandemic in 2020, Ron and wife Sydney retired and moved to Mexico.  Ron has produced 10 studio albums and 2 live albums on Dr. Hook, which garnered 10 top tens on the pop charts in the US and 67 gold and platinum awards worldwide. To date his albums have been turned into greatest hits compilations 9 times from 1976 - 2014.  To music historians, it's no secret that at least two of Ron’s albums are ranked and archived, as the best music produced in the Seventies. He came out of retirement to help develop a new duo Dawn and Nash from 2013 to 2018, formerly known as "Tawny River".  He continues to mentor young new producers looking to make a name in the music industry.

Awards

Together with longtime friend and writer Shel Silverstein, Haffkine produced and released "Where the Sidewalk Ends" on cassette in 1983, as an LP phonograph record in 1984, winning the 1984 Grammy Award for Best Recording for Children.

Discography

All Music Guide
Australian Charts

Studio and live albums

Compilation albums

Singles

Notes

Composer

References

1938 births
Living people
American male composers
American music managers
Grammy Award winners
Record producers from New York (state)